Vasily Telezhkin (born April 19, 1994 in Moscow, Russia) is a Russian curler and curling coach from Moscow.

He is Master of Sports of Russia.

Vasily is one of co-founders of not-professional curling development project called "Russian Curling League".

He is creator an chief editor of Telegram channel "Curlingnews".

Teams

Men's

Mixed

Mixed doubles

Record as a coach of national teams

References

External links
 
 
 Тележкин Василий - игрок | Наградион 
 Video:  

Living people
1994 births
Russian male curlers
Curlers from Moscow
Russian curling coaches